Sarge is a shortened, informal form of the rank of Sergeant.

Other meanings include:

Entertainment 
 Sarge (video game), a 1985 arcade game
 Sarge (band), an indie rock band from Champaign, Illinois (USA)
 Sarge (album), a 1976 album by Delroy Wilson
 Sarge (TV series), starring George Kennedy as a cop-turned-priest

People 
 Sarge (nickname)
 DeWayne Bruce (born 1960), professional wrestler who used the ringname/nickname Sarge

Fictional characters 
 Sergeant Snorkel, in the long running Beetle Bailey comic strip
 Sarge (Toy Story), in the Toy Story franchise
 Sarge (Cars), in the Cars franchise
 Sarge (Red vs. Blue), a machinima character
 Sarge, in the video game Portal Runner
 Sarge, in the video game Quake III Arena
 Sarge, aka Sergeant Hawk, in the video game Army Men
Sarge Fisher, name of a new main character of Siren, a protective merman who forms a connection with human/mermaid hybrid Helen Hawkins
 Sarge (Agents of S.H.I.E.L.D.), a character in Agents of S.H.I.E.L.D.

Other uses 
 Sarge, the codename of version 3.1 of the Debian Linux operating system
 Suborbital Active Rocket with Guidance (SARGE), a rocket being developed by Exos Aerospace